Noureddine Abdallah Kourichi (born 12 April 1954) is a former footballer who played as a defender for several different French and Swiss clubs. Born in France, he represented Algeria at international level and was later the assistant manager of the Algerian national team.

International career
Kourichi was an important member of the Algerian national team at the 1982 FIFA World Cup in Spain and the 1986 FIFA World Cup in Mexico, starting five out of the six games.

External links
 

Living people
1954 births
Sportspeople from Nord (French department)
Footballers from Hauts-de-France
Association football defenders
French footballers
Algerian footballers
Algeria international footballers
AS Poissy players
Valenciennes FC players
FC Girondins de Bordeaux players
Lille OSC players
FC Martigny-Sports players
Ligue 1 players
1982 FIFA World Cup players
1986 FIFA World Cup players
1984 African Cup of Nations players
French sportspeople of Algerian descent
Expatriate footballers in Switzerland
French expatriate footballers
Algerian expatriate footballers
Algerian expatriate sportspeople in Switzerland
French expatriate sportspeople in Switzerland